Grove Place Historic District is a national historic district located at Rochester in Monroe County, New York. The district includes all that remains and is associated with "The Grove," the original homestead area of Rochester's Selden and Ward families.  It is an enclave of 22 substantially intact small-scale 19th century residences, constructed between about 1850 and 1895, which were built, owned, and occupied by this complex extended family.

It was listed on the National Register of Historic Places in 1984.

References

External links

Neighborhood association

Historic districts in Rochester, New York
Historic districts on the National Register of Historic Places in New York (state)
National Register of Historic Places in Rochester, New York